James Browne (died 1865) was an Irish Roman Catholic clergyman who served as Bishop of Kilmore from 1829 to 1865.

He was appointed Coadjutor Bishop of the Diocese of Kilmore on 20 March 1827 and consecrated on 10 June 1827. He succeeded as Diocesan Bishop of Kilmore on 30 April 1829.

He established the St. Augustine's Seminary (Kilmore Academy), a school and minor seminary for the Diocese of Kilmore,  in 1839, and afterwards he acquired a large house and out offices in Farnham Street, Cavan from Captain Joseph Maguire.

He died in office on 11 April 1865.

References

1865 deaths
19th-century Roman Catholic bishops in Ireland
Roman Catholic bishops of Kilmore
Year of birth unknown